Mallada is a genus of lacewings.

Mallada may also refer to:

Mallada basalis, a species of mallada
Esmeralda Mallada (born 1937), Uruguayan astronomer
16277 Mallada, an asteroid named after the astronomer
Teresa Mallada (born 1973), Spanish engineer and politician
Avelino González Mallada (1894–1938), Spanish anarchist